Seven of One was a British comedy series that aired on BBC2 in 1973. Starring Ronnie Barker, Seven of One was a series of seven separate comedies that would serve as possible pilots for sitcoms. Originally it was to be called Six of One, which Barker planned to follow up with another series called And Half a Dozen of the Other. This was a BBC equivalent of a similar showcase for London Weekend Television called Six Dates with Barker created in 1971.

In addition to Barker, Seven of One also featured Roy Castle, Bill Maynard, Talfryn Thomas, Prunella Scales, Glynn Edwards, Joan Sims, Keith Chegwin, Leslie Dwyer, Robin Parkinson, Sam Kelly, Christopher Biggins, Richard O'Callaghan, Yootha Joyce, David Jason, and Avis Bunnage in supporting roles. The series was released on BBC DVD in 2005.

Episodes

Successful pilots
Whilst most of the pilots were not developed any further, Prisoner and Escort was chosen to be developed into a series and became Porridge (1974–1977), which also led to a spinoff series called Going Straight in 1978, a feature film adaptation of Porridge in 1979, and many years later a sequel sitcom Porridge (2016–2017).

Open All Hours was later developed into a sitcom of the same name, Open All Hours (1976, 1981–1982, 1985), and many years later a sequel sitcom named Still Open All Hours (2013–present). Additionally, My Old Man also led to a sitcom of the same name, My Old Man (1974–1975), which was made by Yorkshire Television and shown nationally on ITV, but featuring an entirely new cast led by Clive Dunn.

Ronnie Barker's favourite of the seven pilots was I'll Fly You for a Quid, which he initially chose to do as a series, before being convinced by the BBC that it would be harder to do a full series of scripts about Evan Owen in a Welsh gambling community compared to Norman Stanley Fletcher in the prison setting of Prisoner and Escort.

External links
Seven of One at Nostalgia Central

1973 British television series debuts
1973 British television series endings
1970s British sitcoms
1970s British comedy television series
Television pilots not picked up as a series
BBC television sitcoms
1970s British anthology television series
English-language television shows